Phoberus sulcatus is a beetle of the family Trogidae.

References

Phoberus
Beetles described in 1787